Plasmodium circumflexum is a parasite of the genus Plasmodium subgenus Giovannolaia.

Like all Plasmodium species P. circumflexum has both vertebrate and insect hosts. The vertebrate hosts for this parasite are birds.

Taxonomy
The parasite was first described by Kikuth in 1931 in a juniper thrush. It may have been the same species previous described by Labbe in 1894 who thought it was a species of Haemoproteus.

Description
Schizonts: these are large and when mature may entirely encircle the erythrocyte nucleus.

Merozoites: each schizont gives rise to 13-30 merozoites (mean 19.8: standard deviation 5).

Gametocytes: these are large and when mature may entirely encircle the erythrocyte nucleus.

Distribution

This parasite is found in Argentina, Brazil, Canada, Germany, Italy, Malaysia, Morocco, South Africa, Sri Lanka and the United States.

Vectors 

Culiseta morsitans

Mansonia crassipes

Theobaldia annulata

Sporogeny but not transmission has been recorded in Mansonia perturbans.

Hosts 
P. circumflexum has been recorded infecting the following hosts:

Shikra (Accipiter badius)
Eurasian Sparrowhawk (Accipiter nisus) 
Sharp-shinned hawk (Accipiter striatus), 
Red-winged blackbird (Agelaius phoeniceus), 
Wood duck (Aix sponsa), 
Canvasbacks (Aythya valisineria), 
Blue jay (Cyanocitta cristata), 
Cape May warbler (Dendroica tigrina), 
Gray cat bird (Dumella carolinensis), 
Slate colour junicao (Junico hymenalis), 
Song sparrow (Melospiza melodia), 
Common merganser (Mergus merganser), 
Cowbird (Molothrus ater ater), 
Finch (Richmondena cardinalis cardinalis), 
Trumpeter swan (Olor buccinator), 
Chestnut-tailed starling (Sturnus malabaricus), 
Brown thrasher (Toxostomar ufum), 
White throated sparrow (Tromotrichio albicolis), 
American robin (Turdus migratorius), 
Juniper thrush (Turdus pilaris), 
Wild guineafowl (Numida meleagris) - the pathological features in acute cases include anaemia, jaundice and splenomegaly; in the subacute cases severe splenomegaly, right ventricular hypertrophy and multifocal interstitial myocarditis.
White throated sparrow (Zonotrichia albicollis)

References

External links 

Picture of eythroctic forms - http://workforce.cup.edu/Buckelew/Plasmodium%20circumflexum.htm

circularis
Parasites of birds